Steven Fonti, also known as Steve Fonti (born June 16, 1970), is a Primetime Emmy Award winner who has worked in the Art Department on movies such as Over the Hedge and Adam Sandler's Eight Crazy Nights, Cinderella III: A Twist in Time, Pooh's Heffalump Movie, Osmosis Jones and TV shows including The Simpsons, Family Guy and Futurama. He was also a writer and the storyboard director for Nickelodeon's animated series SpongeBob SquarePants. He also worked on an episode of The Powerpuff Girls called "Catastrophe".

Fonti studied character animation at the California Institute of the Arts, where he produced a parody of Schoolhouse Rock! called Political Correction with fellow student Jory Prum in 1995. The film was part of Spike and Mike's Festival of Animation in 1997. His 1993 student film Yes Timmy, There is a Santa Claus was included in the 1998 Spike and Mike's Sick & Twisted festival.

References

External links
 Political Correction on Vimeo
 "Yes, Timmy, There is a Santa Claus" on YouTube

1970 births
Living people
American storyboard artists
California Institute of the Arts alumni